Tom Bunk (born 17 December 1945) is a lifetime award-winning cartoonist known for adding multiple extraneous details to his posters, cartoons and illustrations created for both American and German publishers.

Early life
Tomas Maria Bunk was born in Split, Croatia, the son of painter  and Marianne née Horl. He studied stage design and fine art at the Academy of Arts in Hamburg, Germany.

Career
In 1973, he moved to Berlin, where he began rendering humorous subjects in oil paintings. After selling these paintings in three successful shows, he turned to cartooning and contributed to underground comics in 1976.

His cartoon creations appeared monthly in the satirical magazine Pardon, other European comic magazines and comic anthologies. After collecting his comics in three books, he moved to New York in 1983 and began drawing for Raw, the graphic story magazine edited and published by Françoise Mouly and Art Spiegelman. He drew Topps trading cards, including Wacky Packages and Garbage Pail Kids. In 1990, he became a regular Mad cartoonist, and his contributions have led some to regard him as the modern-day replacement at Mad for Will Elder.

He illustrates humorous and surreal oil paintings of strange situations and subjects, explaining, "In my paintings, I am interested in telling a story. I like the story to be open ended and enigmatic. It should have an internal truth, which the viewer will recognize in his/her own way. As elements in my storytelling, I use symbols and their arrangement. I like everyday objects to have a meaning beyond the obvious, a metaphysical meaning. When I paint I try to keep a balance between my intellect, my intuition and my somewhat humouristic approach. In this way I keep the painting always interesting and alive for me. This is also what I would like the painting to be for the viewer, a stimulating and entertaining puzzle."

His list of American clients also includes Burger King, Byron Preiss, Silly Productions, Springer International, It's About Time (in association with the American Institute of Physics, the National Science Foundation and the American Geological Institute) and UNICEF. His clients in Germany: Carlsen Verlag, Ravensburger Verlag, Semmel Verlach, Volksverlag, Weissmann Verlag and in 2008 Frankfurter Allgemeine Zeitung, where he had a daily comic running (Ein Berliner in New York) In addition to doing book covers, he also has illustrated  children's books, and since 1990, he contributes illustrations and posters for school science books for the "It's About Time" publisher.

For well over a decade, he has contributed to Quantum, a bimonthly science and mathematics magazine for students. These illustrations were exhibited in 2005 at the New York Hall of Science in Queens and collected in a book, Quantoons, published by the National Science Teachers Association in 2006.
 
Tom Bunk has exhibited his comics and illustrations in Germany. In 2009 he took part in a comic show "Jahrhundert der Comics, die Zeitungs-Strip-Jahre" in Bielefeld and Rehmscheid in 2010 in the Jewish Museum in Berlin, and he exhibited his Quantoons again in 2010 in Frankfurt during the 2015 comicfestival in Munich, Germany.

He continues working mainly for Mad magazine.

References

External links

Gilford, Doug. "Tom Bunk". Mad Cover Site.
bunkArt. Blogger.
BUNKOMIX. Blogger.
bunkartoons. Blogger.

1945 births
Living people
Mad (magazine) cartoonists
Artists from Split, Croatia
Alternative cartoonists
Artists from Berlin